The Palazzo Margherita is a palazzo in Bernalda, a small town in the Basilicata region of Southern Italy. It was built in 1892 by the family of Giuseppe Margherita. Currently it serves as a small luxury hotel owned by Francis Ford Coppola.

History 
The Palazzo Margherita is currently the property of Francis Ford Coppola. In 1904 the film director's grandfather left Bernalda for a new life in America.
The Palazzo was the location for Sofia Coppola's wedding to Thomas Mars in August 2011.  The Coppola family purchased the Palazzo in 2004 and converted it into a small luxury hotel.

In popular culture 
Palazzo Margherita was featured in an episode of Parts Unknown with Anthony Bourdain dining with Coppola.

References

External links 
 Palazzo Margherita – Coppola Resorts website

Hotels in Italy
Buildings and structures in the Province of Matera
Houses completed in 1892
Coppola family